Josef Zeman (8 June 1906 – November 1992) was an Austrian male weightlifter who represented Austria at international competitions.  He competed at the 1928 Summer Olympics in the Light-Heavyweight event and at the 1936 Summer Olympics in the Heavyweight event, finishing in 6th place.

References

Weightlifters at the 1928 Summer Olympics
1906 births
1992 deaths
Austrian male weightlifters
Weightlifters at the 1936 Summer Olympics
Olympic weightlifters of Austria
Sportspeople from Vienna
20th-century Austrian people